The Algarve Football Cup, previously known as Guadiana Trophy until 2013, is a pre-season friendly football tournament played in Portugal (one edition was played in Spain). Benfica is the most successful team in the tournament, having won 8 trophies in 12 participations.

Tournaments

2001
The 2001 competition has taken place between 27–29 July 2001 and featured Farense, Vitória Guimarães and Sevilla. Vitória Guimarães won after the draw in the last match against Sevilla.

2002

2003

2004

2005

The 2005 competition has taken place between 28–30 July 2005 and featured Sporting, Vitória Setubal, Middlesbrough and Betis. Sporting won in the final against Vitória Setubal.

2006
The 2006 competition took place between 27–29 July 2006 and featured Benfica, Sporting and Deportivo La Coruña. Sporting won in the final against Deportivo.

2007

The 2007 competition has taken place between 3–5 August 2007 and featured Benfica, Sporting and Real Betis. Benfica won in the final against rivals Sporting.

2008

The 2008 competition has taken place between 25–27 July 2009 and featured Benfica, Sporting and Blackburn Rovers. Sporting won in the final against Benfica.

2009

The 2009 competition has taken place between 16–18 July 2009 and featured Benfica, Olhanense, Athletic Bilbao and Anderlecht. Benfica won in the final against Olhanense.

2010

The 2010 edition of the tournament has taken place between 30 July - 1 August 2010 and featured English side Aston Villa, alongside Dutch side Feyenoord and Benfica.

2011
The 2011 competition has taken place between 15 and 17 July. It featured Benfica, Paris Saint-Germain and Anderlecht. Benfica won after a draw in the final match against Anderlecht.

2012

The 2012 competition has taken place between 26 and 28 July. It featured Braga, Newcastle United and Olympiacos. Newcastle won in the final against Braga.

Prize Pot €4.5 million euros. Minimum €950,000 for all participants.

2013

The 2013 competition has taken place between 5 and 7 August 2013. It featured Sporting CP, West Ham United and Braga. Braga won in the final against Sporting.

2016

After a two-year hiatus, the competition returned with a new name. It took place between 14 and 16 July 2016 and featured Benfica, Vitória de Setúbal and Derby County. Benfica won in the final against Derby County.

2017

2022

Number of wins

External links

References

 
Portuguese football friendly trophies